The FF.44 was an extensively modified FF.34 with conventional fuselage and tail unit and tractor engine.

Specifications (FF.44)

References

Bibliography

1910s German military reconnaissance aircraft
Floatplanes
Biplanes
Single-engine aircraft
FF.44
Aircraft first flown in 1916